John Nichol may refer to:

 John Pringle Nichol (1804–1859), Scottish scientist; mentor to William Thomson
 John Nichol (biographer) (1833–1894), Scottish biographer
 John Nichol (footballer) (born 1879), English footballer (Grimsby Town)
 John Nichol (RAF officer) (born 1963), RAF navigator shot down and taken prisoner during the first Gulf War
 John Lang Nichol (born 1924), Canadian Senator

See also 
 John Nicoll (disambiguation)
 John Nicholl (disambiguation) (earlier biographies and sources use both spellings)
 John Nichols (disambiguation)
 Johnny Nicol (born 1938), jazz singer